Sunil Kumar Dhar (28 March 1933 – 27 August 2020) was a Bangladeshi classical musician.

Early life and career
Dhar was born in Tarati village, Muktagachha Upazila, Mymensingh District to Akshya Kumar Dhar and Surashibala Dhar.

Dhar took music lessons from Allauddin Khan in 1952. He took lessons  on Dhrupad and Dhamar from Ustad Jagadananda Barua. He was a regular performer in Bangladesh Television and Bangladesh Betar. He is the founder principal of Mymensingh Nazrul Academy since 1966 and the president of Dhruba Parishad Mymensingh unit.

Awards and honors
 "Sangeet Bhashkar" title by Dhruba Parishad 
 Gold medal from Art Council (1958),  Sandipon Sangskritik Sangstha, Bangladesh Nazrul Sangeet Shilpi Parishad and Nazrul Sena, Mymensingh

References

1933 births
2020 deaths
Bengali Hindus
Bangladeshi Hindus
People from Mymensingh District
Bangladeshi male musicians